The Master of G is a line of G-Shock watches produced by Japanese electronics company Casio designed for usage in harsh environments. Many showcase new technology that Casio would eventually introduce into the G-Shock and ProTrek line of watches,  such as an altimeter, digital compass and the Tough Solar feature.

History
The Master of G series officially began in November 1993 when Casio introduced the G-Shock Frogman model in Japan; the case-back featured the word "FROGMAN" and a small figure of a diving frog. It was made for divers and featured a digital dive time mode. The model is made unique by its asymmetrical design of thick rubber shielding around a self-contained module which was to facilitate hand movement when the watch was worn. It had a thick double-tang resin strap. The Frogman proved to be very popular and during the mid-1990s Casio decided to produce more variations starting with the DW-8200 model, including limited edition colours that in some cases have become very valuable. The DW-8200 model also featured a titanium case on some models as opposed to the stainless steel case used in the original Frogman.

The Master of G watches ceased production in 2000 with the exception of the Frogman which continued production and got a special MR-G variant dubbed the MR-G Frogman.

In 2006, the new Mudman models were introduced in the Master of G range of watches followed by the new Gulfman models in 2007.

Subsequent new models have since followed which have more advanced features. The Rangeman series was  introduced in 2013 and has ABC (Altimeter, Barometer, Compass) features. The line was renamed MASTER in 2014, being continued with the previously named MAN line and now includes the Mudmaster (designed for people related for the army or people related with land related jobs), the Gravitymaster (designed for pilots or people related with aviation industry) and the Gulfmaster (designed for marine forces or people related with the shipping industry).

Notable watches in the Master of G lineup are as follows:
 DW-8600 Fisherman (1996): First G-Shock having a tide-graph and moonphase feature. This model was a precursor to the more popular Gulfman series first introduced in 1998.
 DW-9300 Raysman (1998): First G-Shock to have tough solar battery recharging technology.
 DW-9800 Wademan (1999): First G-Shock with directional sensor.
 AW-571 Gaussman (1999): First G-Shock having magnetic field resistance.
 DWG-100 Lungman (1999): First G-Shock incorporating a pulse sensor.
 GW-100 Antman (2000): First G-Shock having the capability to receive time calibration signal from a radio tower.
 GW-9400 Rangeman (2013): First G-Shock incorporating triple sensors (pressure sensor, temperature sensor and direction sensor).
 GPW-1000 Gravitymaster (2016): First G-Shock having GPS-hybrid time reception technology.
 GWN-Q1000 Gulfmaster (2016): First G-Shock with quad sensors (pressure sensor, temperature sensor, depth sensor and direction sensor).
 GPR-B1000 Rangeman (2018): First G-Shock featuring GPS navigation and Memory-In-Pixel (MIP) display technology.

Characteristics
Master of G series watches are invariably amongst the largest G-Shock designs Casio produces, usually suited for those with larger wrists. They are almost always named with a "man" suffix after the initial Frogman model which itself was named for scuba divers.  Three models, the Mudman, Gaussman, Raysman and Rangeman all feature a thick rubber outer layer that surrounds the buttons and case completely, ensuring that they offer mud-resistance. The Gaussman was also ISO-certified anti-magnetic.

Most models consist of a steel case surrounded by a thick neoprene or polyurethane bezel and outer protection.  All models except the earliest Frogman models feature Casio's Illuminator display lighting system and are water resistant to 20 atmospheres (20bar/200metres) which thus makes them suitable for scuba-diving except at depths requiring helium-oxygen gas.

Some of the modules incorporate highly advanced functions. The Riseman features twin sensors that measure both temperature and atmospheric pressure, thus allowing it to serve as a barometer and altimeter. The Raysman was the first model to make use of Tough Solar technology to power its functions, the Wademan featured a digital compass, the Fisherman helped introduce the now-common tide graph and moonphase readouts, and the Antman was the first Casio watch that received an atomic signal that calibrated its timekeeping with atomic clock transponders in Japan.

Today, it is not unusual for two or more of these features to be found in a single Master of G model i.e. the GW-9200 Riseman has Tough Solar to power its radio-calibrated timekeeping and altimeter/barometer/thermometer functions; the GWF-1000 Frogman and GW-9110 Gulfman both feature solar power, radio timekeeping and tide and moon phase indicators. The current GW-9400 Rangeman with triple sensors has the most extensive feature sets so far, with mud/dust resistance, solar power, radio timekeeping, thermometer, barometer, altimeter, and digital compass functions, which have long been provided on Protrek/Pathfinder series. The GPR-B1000, which is the successor to the GW-9400, and is also named Rangeman, has advanced GPS functionality in addition to the triple sensor features of its predecessor.

Collectibility
Earlier and rare models of the Master of G series command strong resale values; examples in NOS (New Old Stock) condition and those including retail packaging command a premium. Prices are often higher outside Japan, not least because many models were produced only for the Japanese domestic market rather than for North America, Europe and Oceania markets.

There have been several limited editions of the Masters series, and depending on their scarcity these command some of the highest prices for any of Casio watches ever produced. The Men in Black and Men in Yellow series are black and yellow versions of the Masters and typically command anywhere between two and three times the resale value of the regular versions. Some models such as the "Brazilian" Frogman, 'Lightning Yellow' Frogman, "Black Panther" Rangeman and A.R.T.P.I Wademan are even scarcer and can command even higher prices, though their value is hard to predict as there are limited numbers and the spot price is largely determined by high desirability from collectors and low numbers of available pieces on the market for sale at any given time.

Models
Antman (discontinued): GW-100
Fisherman (discontinued): DW-8600, superseded by Gulfman.
Frogman: DW-6300, DW-8200, DW-9900, GF-1000, GF-8200, GW-200, GW-201, GW-202, GW-203, GW-204, GW-205, GW-206, GW-225, GWF-1000, GWF-A1000, GWF-D1000, MRG-1100
Gaussman (discontinued): AW-570, AW-571
Gravitymaster: current models are GWR-B1000 (solar-atomic with added Bluetooth connectivity and carbon fibre construction): GPW-2000 (solar-atomic with GPS connectivity and Bluetooth connectivity): GR-B100 (solar powered with Bluetooth connectivity): GA-1100 (battery powered with twin-sensors) and GA-1000 (battery powered with twin-sensors) 
Gulfman (discontinued): G-9100 (battery powered): GW-9100 (solar-atomic): GW-9110 (solar-atomic) and GWM-1000 (solar-atomic: triple sensor) 
Gulfmaster (discontinued): GWN-1000 (solar-atomic), GN-1000 (battery powered with twin sensors) and GWN-Q1000 (Analog/Digital: atomic: solar powered)
Lungman (discontinued): DWG-100
Mudman: G-9000 (battery powered): GW-9300 (solar-atomic) and G-9300 (non-atomic: solar powered)
Mudmaster: current models are GWG-2000 (successor to GWG-1000 with the same features): GWG-1000 (solar-atomic with triple sensor; the only Mudmaster with sapphire glass alongside GWG-2000): GWG-100 (solar-atomic): GSG-100 (solar only; externally the same as the GWG-100): GG-1000 (battery powered with twin-sensors) and GG-B100 (battery powered with quad sensors with added Bluetooth connectivity)
Rangeman: current models are GW-9400 (Altimeter Barometer and Compass functions; solar-atomic), GPR-B1000 (GPS capability and solar powered)
Raysman (discontinued): DW-9300, DW-9350
Revman (discontinued): MRG-1200
Riseman (discontinued): GW-9200, G-9200
Seaman (discontinued): DW-9950
Wademan (discontinued): DW-9800

Gallery

See also 
 Casio
 G-Shock

References

External links

 International G-Shock website
 Casio Protrek
 ShockBase - Biggest G-Shock Database (Unofficial)

Casio brands
Casio watches
Products introduced in 1985